Aporocactus flagelliformis (syn. Disocactus flagelliformis), the rattail cactus, is a species of flowering plant in the cactus family Cactaceae, and is the most cultivated species in the genus Aporocactus. Due to its ease of cultivation and attractive floral displays, it is often grown as an ornamental potted plant.

Description
Stems ascending, later prostrate or pendent, profusely branching at base, 1–2 m long or more, 8–24 mm thick; ribs 7-14, obtuse; margins ± tuberculate; areoles minute, whitish; internodes 4–8 mm; spines 8-20, 3-8 (-10) mm long, bristle-like, yellowish to brownish; epidermis green, later grayish. Flowers zygomorphic, 7–10 cm long, 2-4 (-7,5) cm wide, limb bilaterally symmetric, oblique, diurnal, open for 3–5 days, scentless; pericarpel greenish with acute bracteoles; receptacle 3 cm, long, curved just above pericarpel, bracteoles, brownish, acute; outer tepals linear-lanceolate, ± reflexed, 2–3 cm long, 6 mm wide, crimson; inner tepals narrowly oblong, to 10 mm wide, crimson, sometimes passing to pink along the margins; stamens white to pale pink, erect, exserted; style stigma lobes 5-7, white Fruit globose, 10–12 mm long, red, bristly, pulp yellowish; seeds ovoid, brownish red.

Taxonomy 
Aporocactus used to be a subgenus in Disocactus, but according to molecular evidence, it should be excluded from Disocactus and form a genus on its own. Therefore, the correct scientific name of this species is Aporocactus flagelliformis.

Etymology
The Latin specific epithet flagelliformis means "shaped like a whip", in reference to the long shoots. The common name "rattail" refers to the same feature.

History
One of the first cacti to be introduced into European culture. Watson (1898) offers the year 1690 but probably earlier. This has always been one of the most popular cacti in cultivation. Still almost nothing is known about its natural habit.

Origin and habitat
Mexico: Hidalgo. Dry forests. Lithophytic or epiphytic in dry forests. Seems rare and seldom collected in the field.

Cultivation

Rattail cacti are very easy to grow, being suitable for a greenhouse and container, indoors or out. These plants need a minimum temperature of 6 °C (43 °F). They should be grown in bright, indirect light, in a fairly rich potting mix. The best compost consists of four parts sandy loam, and one part of equal quantities of sand and crushed brick. They should be repotted every other year because their soil tends to sour. This does not mean, however, that they will need larger pots. Once the plants are established, the compost should be kept moist from April to October; less water is required from November until March, just enough to keep the stems from dying back. In the winter, old or discolored stems may be cut out at the base to encourage new growth.

This plant is a recipient of the Royal Horticultural Society's Award of Garden Merit.

References

External links

Anderson, E. F. 2001. The Cactus Family. Timber Press, Portland, Oregon, U.S.

Hylocereeae
Cacti of Mexico
Endemic flora of Mexico
Garden plants of North America
Near threatened biota of Mexico